Chanakya College of Management is an educational institution in Bhaktapur, Nepal.  

It is affiliated with Tribhuvan University and runs Bachelor of Business Studies (BBS) and Master of Business Studies (MBS) programmes.

Universities and colleges in Nepal
Educational institutions established in 2010
2010 establishments in Nepal
Tribhuvan University